Black Square is an album by the group DD/MM/YYYY. In 2009, it was released in Canada (We are Busy Bodies) on March 17; in Europe (Deleted Art) on August 18; in the United States (Impose Records) on September 15); and in the UK/EU (Invada Records) in September 2010.

Track listing
All songs written by Claxton, Del Balso, Holmes, King, Rozenberg

"Bronzage" (3:49)
"No Life" (2:19)
"They" (2:48)
"Infinity Skull Cube" (3:22)
"My Glasses" (1:06)
"Birdtown" (3:42)
"Sirius B" (3:50)
"Lismer" (2:09)
"Real Eyes" (3:43)
"$50,000 Guitar Head" (1:39)
"I'm Still in the Walls" (3:29)
"Digital Haircut" (3:48)
 "Van Tan" (3:40)*

Track 13 is exclusive to the Impose Records American Tape Cassette version of Black Square and originally released on the sold out 7-inch.

Release show
The album release party was held at Lee's Palace in Toronto and featured Black Feelings, Metz and a cover of the DD/MM/YYYY song "Super VGF" by The Meligrove Band.

Song reviews
Chart Attack.ca gave a positive review and link to Infinity Skull Cube's animated music video by Jesi the Elder.

Pitchfork gave Bronzage a 7 saying
 "Bronzage", the opening track on their newest album Black Square, sprints forth with chiming guitars, call-and-response chants, and quick, precise beats.

Charts
DD/MM/YYYY's Black Square made Canadian Charts force field PR says "....originally releasing Black Square in Canada in April — where it reached number two on the Canadian Campus & Community Radio Charts — "

References

DD/MM/YYYY albums
2009 albums